Cruel Intentions is a 1999 American teen romantic drama film written and directed by Roger Kumble and starring Sarah Michelle Gellar, Ryan Phillippe, Reese Witherspoon, and Selma Blair. The film is a modern retelling of Pierre Choderlos de Laclos' 1782 novel Les Liaisons dangereuses, set in New York City among rich high schoolers.

Initially a smaller-budget independent film, it was picked up by Columbia Pictures and widely released on March 5, 1999. Despite mixed critical reviews, the performances of Gellar, Philippe, and Witherspoon were praised and Cruel Intentions has since grossed $76 million worldwide. The box office success spawned a prequel in 2000 and sequel in 2004, as well as a jukebox musical in 2015.

Since its release the film has become regarded as a cult classic.

Plot
In an upscale New York City mansion, wealthy, popular and intelligent teenager Kathryn Merteuil discusses her private school with Mrs. Caldwell and her daughter, Cecile, who will be starting as a Freshman at the school soon. Kathryn promises Mrs. Caldwell that she will look out for the sheltered, naïve Cecile. When Kathryn's stepbrother Sebastian Valmont enters the room, Mrs. Caldwell reacts to him coldly and leaves with Cecile.

Kathryn tells Sebastian that she intends to use Cecile to take revenge on her ex-boyfriend Court Reynolds, who dumped her for Cecile. Kathryn enlists Sebastian, a notorious womanizer, to seduce Cecile, thereby ruining her in Court's eyes. Sebastian refuses because he is planning to seduce Annette Hargrove, the virgin daughter of the new Headmaster at their school, who has written an essay which was published by a magazine in support of chastity until marriage. After some negotiation, they agree on a wager: if Sebastian fails to seduce Annette, Kathryn gets Sebastian's vintage Jaguar XK140; if he succeeds, Kathryn will have sex with him.

Sebastian's first attempt to seduce Annette fails, as she is apparently already aware of his reputation. Sebastian initially suspects Greg, Annette's friend from Kansas who is a popular football player and closeted homosexual. Sebastian convinces Greg to put in a good word about him to Annette, blackmailing him with a photo of him and Sebastian's openly gay friend in bed. Sebastian also finds out that Mrs. Caldwell was the one who warned Annette about Sebastian. Sebastian finally agrees to corrupt Cecile as revenge. Meanwhile, Cecile confides in Kathryn about her romance with her music teacher, Ronald Clifford. Kathryn reveals this to Mrs. Caldwell, who orders Cecile to end the relationship, but only because Ronald is black. Sebastian lures Cecile to his house by claiming he has a letter to her from Ronald. He then gets Cecile drunk and blackmails her into allowing him to perform oral sex on her. The next day, Cecile confides in Kathryn, who advises her to be as promiscuous as possible to learn how to please Ronald.

Sebastian begins to truly fall in love with Annette, who returns his feelings but is still hesitant. Sebastian calls her a hypocrite for resisting the chance for true love despite claiming that she was waiting for it. Annette finally relents, but Sebastian, confused about his own feelings, now refuses her. Annette flees to the estate of her friend's parents. Sebastian finds her and professes his feelings, and they make love.

Kathryn offers herself to Sebastian after he wins the 'bet', but he rejects her, now only wanting Annette. Sebastian informs Kathryn that he was planning to tell Annette the truth, but a jealous and enraged Kathryn warns him that doing so will destroy both his and Annette's reputations. Sebastian lies to Annette, claiming that she was just a conquest and that he has no real feelings for her. Devastated, Annette tells him to leave. Sebastian informs Kathryn that he has broken up with Annette and now wants his reward for winning the bet. Kathryn reveals that he, not Annette, was the true target of her scheme and that she manipulated him into abandoning Annette for her own amusement. She then dismisses him, telling him that she doesn't sleep with "losers".

Sebastian tries to contact Annette to confess the truth and beg for a second chance, but she refuses to see him. He gives her his journal, in which he has detailed Kathryn's manipulative schemes, their bet, and his true feelings for Annette. Seeking revenge, Kathryn calls Ronald, claiming that Sebastian hurt her and slept with Cecile. Ronald violently confronts Sebastian, and the ensuing fight migrates to the middle of the street. Annette tries to intervene but is thrown into traffic. Sebastian pushes her to safety but ends up getting hit by a taxi. Sebastian and Annette confess their love for each other before he dies. Ronald witnesses this and leaves angry once he finds out from Annette that Kathryn used him.

At Sebastian's funeral, Kathryn delivers a eulogy, which people start leaving midway through. Kathryn rushes outside to find Cecile handing out copies of Sebastian's journal. As the details of her manipulations and drug abuse are made public, Kathryn's reputation is finally destroyed. Feeling guilt over his role in causing Sebastian's death, Ronald writes a detailed confession of how she lied to him about Cecile not being a virgin and her claims about Sebastian hitting her in order to have him killed. It is implied that the disapproving headmaster will expel her from the school, especially after finding cocaine hidden in the cross of her rosary. In the final scene, Annette drives away in Sebastian's car with his journal at her side, recalling their fondest moments together.

Cast 
 Sarah Michelle Gellar as Kathryn Merteuil, based on the Marquise de Merteuil
 Ryan Phillippe as Sebastian Valmont, based on the Vicomte de Valmont
 Reese Witherspoon as Annette Hargrove, based on Madame de Tourvel
 Selma Blair as Cecile Caldwell, based on Cécile Volanges
 Louise Fletcher as Helen Rosemond, based on Madame de Rosemonde
 Joshua Jackson as Blaine Tuttle
 Eric Mabius as Greg McConnell
 Sean Patrick Thomas as Ronald Clifford, based on the Chevalier Danceny
 Swoosie Kurtz as Dr. Regina Greenbaum (Kurtz portrayed Madame de Volanges in the 1988 film version of Dangerous Liaisons)
 Christine Baranski as Bunny Caldwell, based on Madame de Volanges
 Alaina Reed Hall as Nurse
 Deborah Offner as Mrs. Michalak
 Tara Reid as Marci Greenbaum
 Hiep Thi Le as Mai-Lee
 Herta Ware as Mrs. Sugarman
 Drew Snyder as Headmaster Hargrove
 Charlie O'Connell as Court Reynolds, based on the Comte de Gercourt
 Fred Norris as Meter Maid

Production

One of the filming locations was Old Westbury Gardens in Nassau County, New York, as well as the Harry F. Sinclair House in New York City. In a 2016 interview, Sarah Michelle Gellar revealed that the original title of the movie was to be "Cruel Inventions".

Reception
Cruel Intentions received mixed reviews from critics. On Rotten Tomatoes, the film has an approval score of 54% based on reviews from 114 critics, with an average rating of 5.20/10. The site's consensus states: "This darkly comic drama and its attractive young cast are easy on the eyes, but uneven performances and an uninspired script conspire to foil Cruel Intentions". Metacritic gave the film an average score of 56 out of 100 based on reviews from 24 critics.

Charles Taylor of Salon.com described the film as "the dirtiest-minded American movie in recent memory – and an honestly corrupt entertaining picture is never anything to sneeze at". Stephen Holden of The New York Times wrote: "You have the queasy sense that the whole thing is just an elaborate stunt and, in this case, an exploitative one". Despite this, Roger Ebert, a noted film critic for The Chicago Sun-Times, praised Cruel Intentions and gave the film three out of four stars in his review, stating that it was smart and merciless in the tradition of the original story.

Box office
Cruel Intentions was a commercial success, grossing $13,020,565 in its opening weekend, ranking #2 behind Analyze This; released in 2,312 theaters, the movie raked in $76.3 worldwide against a $10.5 million budget.

Awards and nominations

Soundtrack 

The Cruel Intentions soundtrack is a compilation soundtrack released on March 9, 1999, by Arista/Virgin Records. It reached number 60 on the Billboard chart. The lead track for the film was "Bitter Sweet Symphony" by rock band The Verve.

Subsequent media

Direct-to-video films 
Cruel Intentions 2 was released direct-to-video in 2001, written and directed by Roger Kumble, assembled from three episodes filmed for Manchester Prep, a prequel series scrapped by Fox. The story features younger versions of Sebastian Valmont and Kathryn Merteuil played by Robin Dunne and Amy Adams.

Cruel Intentions 3 followed in 2004, directed by Scott Ziehl, starring Kerr Smith and Kristina Anapau, as Cassidy Merteuil, cousin to Kathryn.

None of the cast from the original appeared in the sequels.

Canceled sequel series

NBC picked up a television pilot for a continuation of the film's storyline in October 2015. The pilot was set seventeen years after the events of the film and sees Bash Casey, son of Sebastian Valmont and Annette Hargrove, discover his late father's journal. Upon discovering this he is thrown into a world of lies, sex and power. The potential series was to have Kathryn Merteuil, Bash's step-aunt, attempt to gain power of Valmont International.

Four months later in February, Taylor John Smith and Samantha Logan were cast, with Smith playing the male lead role of Bash Casey, Sebastian Valmont and Annette Hargrove's son. Gellar reached a deal with producers to reprise her role as the female lead, Kathryn Merteuil. In March, Kate Levering was cast to replace Witherspoon for the role of Annette Hargrove.

Several months later, on October 31, NBC passed on the project and the series did not go forward.

Planned reboot series
As of October 2021, a television series reboot of Cruel Intentions was in development for IMDb TV (now Amazon Freevee).

Musical

A 1990s jukebox musical by Kumble, Rosin, and Ross, was first staged in 2015. After two runs in Los Angeles and a pop-up engagement in New York, Cruel Intentions: The '90s Musical made its Off-Broadway debut at the Greenwich Village nightclub Le Poisson Rouge in November 2017 and ran through April 2018. Set to pop and rock hits of the 1990s and songs from the film's soundtrack, the plot follows the manipulations of Sebastian Valmont and Kathryn Merteuil, out to destroy anyone who gets in their way.

References

External links

 
 
 
 
 

1999 films
1999 directorial debut films
1999 LGBT-related films
1999 romantic drama films
1990s teen drama films
1990s teen romance films
American high school films
American romantic drama films
American teen drama films
American teen LGBT-related films
American teen romance films
Bisexuality-related films
Columbia Pictures films
Films about interracial romance
Films about narcissism
Films about siblings
Films about virginity
Films about the upper class
Films based on French novels
Films based on romance novels
Films based on works by Pierre Choderlos de Laclos
Films directed by Roger Kumble
Films produced by Neal H. Moritz
Films scored by Edward Shearmur
Films set in Manhattan
Films shot in Los Angeles
Films shot in New York City
Films shot in Toronto
Incest in film
Newmarket films
Original Film films
Teensploitation
Works based on Les Liaisons dangereuses
Films with atheism-related themes
1990s English-language films
1990s American films